Fawzi Chaaban (7 October 1930 – 10 May 1992) was an Egyptian sprinter. He competed in the men's 100 metres at the 1952 Summer Olympics.

References

1930 births
1992 deaths
Athletes (track and field) at the 1952 Summer Olympics
Egyptian male sprinters
Egyptian male triple jumpers
Olympic athletes of Egypt
Place of birth missing
Mediterranean Games medalists in athletics
Mediterranean Games silver medalists for Egypt
Mediterranean Games bronze medalists for Egypt
Athletes (track and field) at the 1951 Mediterranean Games
Athletes (track and field) at the 1955 Mediterranean Games
20th-century Egyptian people